Carlos del Junco (born May 17, 1958) is a Cuban-Canadian harmonica player.

Career
Del Junco was born in Cuba and moved to Canada with his family in 1959. He started to play harmonica when he was fourteen. He graduated from Ontario College of Art where he majored in sculpture.

He plays a ten-hole diatonic harmonica using an  "overblow" technique developed by Howard Levy of Béla Fleck and the Flecktones.

In the 1980s, Del Junco performed with Eyelevel, Ontario College of Art Swing Band, and for six years with the rhythm and blues group the Buzz Upshaw Band. In 1990, he formed the blues/jazz fusion band the Delcomos. He has recorded with Marcel Aymar, Cassandra Vasik, and Oliver Schroer.

In addition to leading his band the Blue Mongrels, he has worked with Kevin Breit, Bruce Cockburn, Holly Cole, and Kim Mitchell. He wrote music for Dry Lips Oughta Move to Kapuskasing, a play by Tomson Highway that was produced in 1991. At the Hohner World Harmonica Championship in Germany in 1999, he won two gold medals, one each in the blues and jazz categories. In November of that year he released his first album.

Accompanied by guitarist Jimmy Bowskill, he recorded the album Blues Etc. (2016) in his living room with a laptop computer.

Awards and honors
 Harmonica Player of the Year (eight times), Maple Blues Awards, Toronto Blues Society
 Blues Musician of the Year, Jazz Report magazine, 1996
 Gold Medals (2), Hohner World Harmonica Championship, Germany, 1999
 Best Blues Album nomination, Juno Awards, 1999
 Best Blues Award, NOW magazine, 2007

Discography
 Blues (1993) with Bill Kinnear
 Big Road Blues (1995) with Thom Roberts
 Just Your Fool (1996)
 Big Boy (1999)
 Up and at 'Em (2001)
 Blues Mongrel (2005)
 Steady Movin'  (2008)
 Mongrel Mash (2011)
 Blues Etc. (2016) with Jimmy Bowskill

References

 Live Tour Artists website
 Toronto Star, July 4, 2005
 Blues Review, June/July 2005, p. 47
 Le Journal, December 4, 2004 (French)
 Seattle Times, April 25, 2005
 Times Herald, February 25, 2005
 Chicago Sun-Times, April 28, 2006

External links
 Official site

1958 births
Living people
People from Havana
Canadian jazz musicians
Jazz harmonica players
Canadian harmonica players
Cuban emigrants to Canada
Canadian world music musicians
Northern Blues Music artists